Devils on horseback are a hot appetizer or small savoury dish of dried fruit stuffed with such ingredients as cheese or nuts, wrapped in bacon,  prosciutto or pancetta. The traditional form of the dish is made with a pitted prune and bacon, but dates are also used, usually steeped in brandy or some other liqueur. These are then fried or baked in the oven and quite often served on toast, with chutney and mustard.

The origin of the name "devils on horseback" is unclear. The Oxford English Dictionary states they are "Probably so called on account of being typically served very hot", and gives the earliest reference to 1885, in American agricultural magazine The Country Gentleman. Another source states that there are "a surfeit of theories", but dates the idea (as a refinement of the oyster in bacon combination) to 1800. One recurring suggestion fancifully suggests the name derives from "Norman raiders (who) would ride into towns wearing rashers of bacon over their armour to scare villagers". However the earliest mention of this is from 2008, while the dish itself dates from the 19th century, itself 800 years after the Norman Conquest.

Recipes vary, but in general they are a variation on angels on horseback (bacon wrapped oysters), made by replacing oysters with dried fruit. There are many variations on the basic concept of a bacon-wrapped prune, stuffed with cheese, almonds, or other foods. Devils on horseback are commonly served as part of a Christmas feast.

See also
 Bacon wrapped food
 List of hors d'oeuvre
 List of stuffed dishes

References

External links
 
  Recipe using prunes.
  Recipe using dates.

Appetizers
Christmas food
English cuisine
Stuffed dishes
Date dishes
Bacon dishes